Dębinki may refer to the following places:
Dębinki, Lublin Voivodeship (east Poland)
Dębinki, Legionowo County in Masovian Voivodeship (east-central Poland)
Dębinki, Nowy Dwór Mazowiecki County in Masovian Voivodeship (east-central Poland)
Dębinki, Wyszków County in Masovian Voivodeship (east-central Poland)